The Jungle Book is a 2016 American fantasy adventure film directed and co-produced by Jon Favreau, written by Justin Marks and produced by Walt Disney Pictures. Starring Neel Sethi, with the voices of Bill Murray, Ben Kingsley, Idris Elba, Lupita Nyong'o, Scarlett Johansson, Giancarlo Esposito, and Christopher Walken, the film focuses on the story of Mowgli, an orphaned human boy who, guided by his animal guardians, sets out on a journey of self-discovery while evading the threatening Shere Khan. The film was released in North America in Disney Digital 3-D, RealD 3D, IMAX 3D, D-Box, and premium large formats, on April 15, 2016. The film was released to universal acclaim, with Rotten Tomatoes gave an approval rating of 95%, based on 268 reviews, with an average rating of 7.8/10 and Metacritic gave a score of 77 out of 100, based on 49 reviews.

Accolades

References

External links
 

Lists of accolades by film
Disney-related lists
accolades